Pisarzowice  is a village in the administrative district of Gmina Miękinia, within Środa Śląska County, Lower Silesian Voivodeship, in southwestern Poland. Prior to 1945 it was in Germany.

References

Villages in Środa Śląska County